Robert Auriol Hay-Drummond, 10th Earl of Kinnoull  (18 March 1751 – 19 April 1804) was a Scottish peer and Lord Lyon King of Arms. His titles were Earl of Kinnoull, Viscount Dupplin and Lord Hay of Kinfauns in the Peerage of Scotland and Baron Hay of Pedwardine in the Peerage of Great Britain.

Biography

Robert Auriol Hay-Drummond was the eldest son of the Most Rev. and Rt. Hon. Robert Hay Drummond, the Archbishop of York, and Henrietta Auriol. In 1739, his father Robert Hay took on the Drummond name and arms as heir of entail of his great-grandfather William, Viscount Strathallan.

Robert Hay-Drummond succeeded to the title of Earl of Kinnoull on 27 December 1787 on the death of his uncle, Thomas Hay.

From 1796, when he was sworn of the Privy Council, until his death in 1804, Lord Kinnoull served as Lord Lyon King of Arms. He was succeeded as Lord Lyon and in the earldom of Kinnoull by his son Thomas.

On 19 April 1779, Hay-Drummond married his first wife, Julia Eyre. On 8 June 1781, he married Sarah Harley, daughter and co-heiress of the Hon Thomas Harley MP, Lord Mayor of London.

Marriage and issue
Hay-Drummond married Julia Eyre on 12 April 1779; she died 29 March 1780. On 3 June 1781, he married Sarah, fourth daughter of Right Hon. Thomas Harley, Lord Mayor of London. They had four children:

Henrietta (23 August 1783 – 7 October 1854) - married Henry Drummond, grandson of Henry, Viscount Melville
Thomas Robert (5 April 1785 18 – February 1866)
Francis John (17 September 1786– 20 October 1810) - drowned in the River Earn
Sarah Maria (21 June 1788 – 11 July 1874) - married the Rev. George Murray, Bishop of Rochester, nephew of the Duke of Atholl

References

1751 births
1804 deaths
10
Lord Lyon Kings of Arms
Scottish genealogists
Members of the Privy Council of the United Kingdom